The men's javelin throw event at the 2001 European Athletics U23 Championships was held in Amsterdam, Netherlands, at Olympisch Stadion on 13 and 14 July.

Medalists

Results

Final
14 July

Qualifications
13 July
Qualifying 76.00 or 12 best to the Final

Group A

Group B

Participation
According to an unofficial count, 20 athletes from 14 countries participated in the event.

 (1)
 (1)
 (1)
 (1)
 (3)
 (1)
 (3)
 (1)
 (1)
 (1)
 (1)
 (2)
 (1)
 (2)

References

Javelin throw
Javelin throw at the European Athletics U23 Championships